Hendrik Bernardus Thom (13 December 1905 – 4 November 1983) was a British professor and former Rector of the Stellenbosch University.

Life and career 
Thom was born in Jamestown, Cape Colony, and grew up in Burgersdorp, South Africa. Because he was the 5th grandchild of his grandfather and namesake with the first names Hendrik Bernardus, his parents decided to call him by the nickname Quintus ("Five") to distinguish him from his cousins; he was known as Quintie Thom throughout his life.
He matriculated at Burgersdorp High School and studied at Stellenbosch University (BA History and Dutch, cum laude, 1926 and MA History, cum laude, 1928). He continued his studies in history in Germany at the Friedrich Wilhelms Universität in Berlin (1928–1929), at the Sorbonne in Paris (1930) and in Amsterdam, researching his doctoral thesis, which he completed on his return to Stellenbosch. The title of his doctoral thesis (PhD, 1930) was: Die geskiedenis van die skaapboerdery in Suid-Afrika (The history of sheep farming in South Africa).

During the next year he was appointed as lecturer of history at the Stellenbosch University, and promoted to senior lecturer in 1935. In 1937 he was appointed as professor of history at the same institution.
From 1954 H.B. Thom was Rector of the Stellenbosch University until his retirement in 1969. In 1983 he was voted Chancellor, but he died at the end of the same year having served as Chancellor of the university for only nine months. The HB Thom theatre at the university was named in his honour. In 2018, this theatre was renamed to the Adam Small Theatre Complex in the spirit of recognition, redress and reconciliation.

H.B. Thom enjoyed tennis, fishing and photography and married Maria du Toit in 1934; the marriage was childless.

He played a major role in the cultural life of the Afrikaner people, and wrote a number of important historical books.

He served on the Archives Commission (Argiefkommissie) and acted as chairman from 1950 to 1955. He was a member of the Historical Monuments Commission (Historiese Monumentekommissie, later Raad vir Nasionale Gedenkwaardighede), 1948–1954; Van Riebeeck-Vereniging; Simon van der Stel Foundation; Stellenbosch Museum and chairman of its Board of Trustees, 1962–1968.

He received honorary memberships of the following organisations:
 Nederlandse Koninklijke Akademie voor Wetenschappen 1952
 Maatschappij der Nederlandse Letterkunde te Leiden
 Linschoten Vereniging
 The Hakluyt Society
 Suid-Afrikaanse Akademie vir Wetenskap en Kuns 1981
 Suid-Afrikaanse Historiese Vereniging

For 18 years he was chairman of the FAK (Federasie van Afrikaanse Kultuurvereniginge) and he was a sought after speaker.
He served as Administrator of the Woordeboek van die Afrikaanse Taal (WAT).

Awards and honours
SA Academy for Arts and Science Award for History 1952
Honorary medal extraordinaire for the promotion of Afrikaans literature and culture 1959
Honorary medal extraordinaire for services rendered on behalf of university education 1969
D.F. Malan Medal 1975
Academy for Arts and Science Award ( vir volksdiens) 1980
Doctor honoris causa of Stellenbosch and Orange Free State universities

Books written
Die Boodskap van 'n Honderd Jaar (Feesrede), 1947
Die Lewe van Gerrit Maritz, 1947 (Second edition 1965)
Die Geloftekerk en ander Studies oor die Groot Trek, 1949
Jannie Marais, 1950
Daghregister van Jan Antonisz van Riebeeck, 1952 (translated by HB and Maria Thom)
Die Nuwe Beeld van ons Weermag, (editor), 1963
Die Uitdaging van die Toekoms, (editor), 1965
Stellenbosch, 1866–1966 (co-author), 1966
D.F. Malan, 1980 (incomplete)
Contributed to: Geskiedenis van Suid-Afrika (editors: Van der Walt, Wiid en Geyer), Suid-Afrikaanse Bibliografiese Woordeboek and Argief-jaarboek.
Member of the editorial staff of Nederlandse tydskrif Bijdragen voor de Geschiedenis der Nederlanden.

References
Professor HB Thom (Editors: DJ Kotze, Bun Booyens, JJ Oosthuysen and GPJ Trumpelmann), Stellenbosch University, 1969.

External links
 Stellenbosch Writers

1905 births
1983 deaths
People from Walter Sisulu Local Municipality
Cape Colony people
Afrikaner people
South African people of German descent
20th-century South African historians
Historians of Africa
Historians of South Africa
Stellenbosch University alumni
University of Paris alumni